Debabrata is an Indian name. It may refer to:

 Debabrata Bandyopadhyay, Indian politician
 Debabrata Basu, Indian statistician
 Debabrata Biswas, Indian singer
 Debabrata Biswas (politician)
 Debabrata Das, Indian cricketer
 Debabrata Pradhan, Indian cricketer
 Debabrata Roy, Indian football player
 Debabrata Mukherjee (cricketer), Indian cricketer
 Debabrata Saikia, Indian politician
 Debabrata Sharma, Indian activist
 Debabrata Barua Paul, Bangladeshi cricketer
 Debabrata Adhikary, Indian Private Teacher

Indian masculine given names